Entraigues-sur-la-Sorgue is a commune in the Vaucluse department in the Provence-Alpes-Côte d'Azur region of Southeastern France.

Population
In 2017, it had a population of 8,472.

See also
Communes of the Vaucluse department

References

Communes of Vaucluse